Digama rileyi is a moth of the family Erebidae. It is found in Africa, including Uganda.

External links
 Species info

Aganainae
Insects of Uganda
Moths of Africa
Moths described in 1958